Comboyne ( or , both ) is a village on the Mid North Coast region of New South Wales. It is situated on the Comboyne Plateau, some 60 km south-west of Port Macquarie, 35 km west of Kew and 54 km north-west of Taree. It is an attractive agricultural area with fertile soils and a high rainfall. The word "Comboyne" is a corruption of the local Biripi people's name for "a place of kangaroos" (Gambuyn).

The Birpai (also known as Birrbay) people have lived in this area for more than 40,000 years.

Previously, the area was covered in sub-tropical rainforest which has almost all been cleared by the early 20th century. The early explorers originally sought the valuable timber of the Australian Red Cedar. The second oldest natural reserve in the state is at nearby Boorganna Nature Reserve which preserves a remnant of sub-tropical rainforest. The Antarctic beech has been recorded at four sites in the Comboyne area.

Geology and climate 
The annual average rainfall at Comboyne is a high 1818 mm. The climate is sub tropical, though at an elevation of 705 metres, it is cooler than at the coast nearby. Soils are derived from basalt, which provide a deep red loam. Below the basalt are less fertile sedimentary rocks. The Comboyne Shield Volcano erupted some 11 to 13 million years ago. The Comboyne plateau is a scarp-bounded paleoplain located between the central north coast of New South Wales and the Great Dividing Range. Miocene basalts overlie much of the plateau, creating relatively fertile red/brown soils. In the southern third of the plateau are underlying Triassic sediments of the Lorne basin. The plateau has a wet, sub tropical climate, though subject to frost and occasional snow.

References 

Towns in New South Wales
Mid North Coast